Mizo grammar is the grammar of the Mizo language, a Tibeto-Burman language spoken by about a million people in Mizoram, Manipur, Tripura, Burma and Chittagong Hill Tracts of Bangladesh. It is a highly inflected language, with fairly complex noun phrase structure and word modifications. Nouns and pronouns are declined, and phrasal nouns also undergo an analogous declension.

Word order
Mizo declarative word order is Object-subject-verb, as in:

Nouns
There is no grammatical gender in Mizo language, although some animals, birds etc. have names which contain one of the suffixes -nu, which means female, or -pa which means male. Examples include chingpirinu (a type of big owl), kawrnu (a type of cicada), thangfènpa (a nocturnal bird).

Non-derived nouns
Mizo is an agglutinative language in which it is rare to find morphologically simple, non-derived nouns. However, common everyday objects and domestic animals tend to fall in this category, that is, the category of morphologically simple, non-derived nouns. For example,

Derived nouns
The most common form of noun is that of derived, morphologically complex, poly-syllabic nouns. Most abstract nouns belong to this category, and so do wild animals and other less common objects. Examples include

Pluralisation
Nouns are pluralised by the addition of one of the suffixes -te, -ho, -teho and -hote. However, a non-pluralised noun can have the sense of a pluralised noun, and common nouns are usually not pluralised, as in:

Here sava is not pluralised to savate or savaho; rather, sava functions as a plural.

Declension of nouns
Nouns are declined into cases as follows (here we show the tones in accordance with the usage in Mizo Wiktionary, which is an extension of the common usage in Mizo newspapers such as Vanglaini and monthlies such as Lengzem chanchinbu):
{|class="wikitable"
|-
!Noun (Nominative case)!!Genitive case!!Accusative case!!Ergative case||Instrumental case
|-
|nụláthe/a girl||nụlathe/a girl's||nụláthe/a girl||nụláịn(by) the/a girl||nụláinusing/with a girl
|-
|tǔiwater||tǔi||tǔi||tuiịn||tuiin
|-
|}

Proper nouns are also declined in the same manner:

Nominalisation
Verbs and adjectives are nominalised by suffixing -na, and adjectives can also be nominalised by suffixing -zia. For example:
{|class="wikitable"
|-
!Verb!!Adjective!!Nominalisation by -na!!Nominalisation by -zia'|-
|kal|| ||kạlna|| 
|-
| ||süal||sùalna||
|-
| ||süal|| ||sùalzìa
|-
|vùa||||vûakna||
|-
|}
When -na is suffixed to a transitive verb then the resulting noun means either the instrument with which the action described by the verb is achieved, or the object/sufferer of the action or the point of action of the verb. For example, vùa means to beat/strike with a stick, and vûakna means a whip, an object with which one can beat, or a point or place where the beating takes place, a point where something is beaten.

When -na is suffixed to an intransitive verb, then the resulting noun means a place etc. through which the action can take place. For example, kal means to go, kalna means where something/someone goes or can go, way, path. For example:

When -zia is suffixed to an adjective, the resulting noun means the condition of having the quality described by the adjective. For example, süal means evil, sùalzìa' means sinfulness, evilness.

Agentiviser
The suffix -tu in Mizo ṭawng is equivalent to the suffix -er or -or in English, as in:

Pronouns

Forms
All Mizo pronouns occur in two forms, namely in free form and clitic form:

The free form is mostly used for emphasis, and has to be used in conjunction with either the clitic form or an appropriate pronominal particle, as shown in the following examples:
 Kei (=I free form) ka (=I clitic form)lo tel ve kher a ngai em?. This is a somewhat emphatic way of saying Ka lo tel ve kher a ngai em? Nangni (=you pl., free form) in (you pl., clitic form) zo tawh em? This is a somewhat emphatic way of saying Nangni in zo tawh em? Ani (he/she) a (s/he) kal ve chuan a ṭha lo vang.

The clitic form is also used as a genitive form of the pronoun.

Declension
Mizo pronouns, like Mizo nouns, are declined into cases as follows:

Adjectives

Attributive
Mizo adjectives (Mizo: hrilhfiahna), when used attributively, follow the nouns they describe, as follows:

Predicative
When used predicatively, Mizo adjectives are syntactically verbs, being usually preceded by the subject pronoun clitics, as in:

In these two sentences, a is the subject pronoun clitic, and the adjectives fel and ṭha function as verbs (syntactically).

Adjective sequences
When adjectives follow each other, the preferred order is the following:
 color
 quality or opinion
 size
 shape
as inPuan sen (color) mawi (quality) hlai (size) bial (shape) deuh.Quantifiers
The most common quantifiers in Mizo ṭawng are zawng zawng (all/each and every), ṭhenkhat (some [of a whole]), väi (all/every), zà (all/every). Some examples are given below:

Verbs

Occurrence
Verbs (Mizo: thiltih) and verb phrases occur last in a sentence. Since adjectives can function as verbs, it is common in sentences to have no true verb, as in:A fel vek mai angA dik vêl vek!In these two sentences, the adjectives fel and dik function syntactically as verbs, and there are no other verbs in either of them.

Tense
Mizo verbs are not conjugated by changing the desinence. The tense is clarified by the aspect and the addition of conjugating particles, such asang (for forming simple future), tawh (for forming simple past and past perfect), mék (for forming progressive tenses, present and past), dáwn (for forming simple future), dáwn mék (for forming near future), 
etc.

Adverbs

Occurrence
Adverbs usually follow the verbs or adjectives they describe.

Notes and referencesOthers: Dokhuma, James, Mizo ṭawng kalphung Zoppen club, Mizo ṭawng thumal thar, 2011.
 SCERT, Mizo grammar and composition'', cl XI & XII textbooks.

Mizo language
Sino-Tibetan grammars